Poovilangu Mohan is an Indian film and television actor. He got the sobriquet "Poovilangu" because of his performance in the Tamil film Poovilangu. He has acted in more than 100 movies in supporting roles and played leading parts in many Television serials.

Partial filmography
Actor

Dubbing artist

Television

References 
 
 
 

Living people
Tamil male actors
Tamil theatre
Tamil male television actors
Tamil television presenters
Television personalities from Tamil Nadu
Male actors from Tamil Nadu
Male actors in Tamil cinema
Year of birth missing (living people)
Place of birth missing (living people)